I Have Fought Against It, but I Can't Any Longer. is the sixth full-length studio album by the American experimental metal band the Body. The album was released on May 11, 2018, through Thrill Jockey. The band have described the album as their most ambitious to date, featuring samples of their own past recordings. The album's title is an excerpt from Virginia Woolf's suicide letter.

Critical reception
{{Album ratings
| aggregate1 = Album of the Year
| aggregate1score = 76/100
| MC        = 75/100
| rev1      = AllMusic
| rev1score = 
| rev9      = Pitchfork
| rev9score = 7.8/10.0
| rev10     = Rolling Stone
| rev10score= 
| rev2      = The A.V. Club
| rev2score = B+
| rev3      = Consequence of Sound
| rev3score = B
| rev4      = Drowned in Sound
| rev4score = 8/10
| rev5      = The Line of Best Fit
| rev5score = 7/10
| rev6      = Loud and Quiet
| rev6score = 7/10
| rev7      = Louder Sound
| rev7score = 
| rev8      = Metal Injection
| rev8score = 8/10<ref>{{Cite news |last=Pementel, Michael |date=May 9, 2018 |title=Album Review: The Body I Have Fought Against It, but I Can't Any Longer |work=Metal Injection |url=https://metalinjection.net/reviews/the-body-i-have-fought-against-it-but-i-cant-any-longer |access-date=October 15, 2021}}</ref>
}}I Have Fought Against It, but I Can't Any Longer was met with "generally favorable" reviews from critics. At Metacritic, which assigns a weighted average rating out of 100 to reviews from mainstream publications, this release received an average score of 75, based on 9 reviews. Aggregator Album of the Year gave the release a 76 out of 100 based on a critical consensus of 12 reviews.

Pitchfork included I Have Fought Against It, but I Can't Any Longer. on its list of 2018's best metal albums.

 Track listing 

 Personnel I Have Fought Against It, but I Can't Any Longer.'' credits adapted from AllMusic.

The Body
 Lee Buford 
 Chip King

Additional musicians
 Michael Berdan (Uniform) – vocals
 Ben Eberle (Sandworm) – vocals
 Laura Gulley (Amoebic Ensemble) – viola, violin
 Kristin Hayter (Lingua Ignota) – piano, vocals
 Jim Manchester – vocals
 Seth Manchester – drums, programming
 Ryan Seaton – saxophone
 Keith Souza – drums, keyboards
 Chrissy Wolpert (Assembly of Light Choir) – piano, vocals

Production
 Seth Manchester – engineering, production
 Keith Souza – engineering, production
 Paco Barba – layout
 Richard Rankin – artwork, photography

References

External links 
 I Have Fought Against It, but I Can't Any Longer. on Bandcamp

2018 albums
The Body (band) albums
Thrill Jockey albums